Philip D. Estes (born June 7, 1958) is an American college football coach and former player. He was the head football coach at Brown University from December 1997 until stepping down in November 2018. Estes compiled a 115-94 record during his tenure at Brown University. He was the most successful coach at Brown University since the inception of the Ivy League in 1956. His three Ivy League championships are also the most of any Brown coach in the Ivy League era.

Estes is an alumnus of the University of New Hampshire and a former offensive lineman on the Wildcat's football team. Prior to receiving the head coach position at Brown, Estes served as an assistant at New Hampshire and Brown, as well as a high school coach.

Head coaching record

References

1958 births
Living people
American football offensive linemen
Brown Bears football coaches
New Hampshire Wildcats football coaches
New Hampshire Wildcats football players
High school football coaches in New Hampshire
Sportspeople from Cedar Rapids, Iowa
People from Laconia, New Hampshire